Reginald Fox (22 December 1881, in Stoke Newington, London – 3 May 1943, in Harefield, Middlesex) was a British actor. He appeared with Louise Maurel and John Hamilton in a dramatic short film, The Whistler (released December 1926), directed by Miles Mander, and made in the Phonofilm sound-on-film system.

Selected filmography
 The Man Who Bought London (1916)
 The Flame (1920)
 The Shadow of Evil (1921)
 Daniel Deronda (1921)
 The Kensington Mystery (1924)
 Livingstone (1925)
 Robinson Crusoe (1927)
 Troublesome Wives (1928)
 The American Prisoner (1929)
 Little Miss London (1929)
 The Compulsory Husband (1930)

References

External links

1881 births
1943 deaths
Male actors from London
English male film actors
English male silent film actors
20th-century English male actors